The 2016 Florida State Seminoles football team represented Florida State University in the sport of American football during the 2016 NCAA Division I FBS football season.  The Seminoles competed in the Atlantic Division of the Atlantic Coast Conference and were led by seventh-year head coach Jimbo Fisher. Home games were played at Doak Campbell Stadium in Tallahassee, Florida.

In 2015, the Seminoles won 10 games and appeared in the Chick-fil-A Peach Bowl. Safety Jalen Ramsey and kicker Roberto Aguayo went on to be selected in the NFL Draft.

Prior to the start of the 2016 season, Dalvin Cook, Derwin James, Roderick Johnson and DeMarcus Walker were named pre-season All-Americans. In the pre-season media poll, Florida State was picked to finish second in the ACC Atlantic and Dalvin Cook was picked as runner-up for ACC Player of the Year while Cook, Roderick Johnson, Travis Rudolph, DeMarcus Walker, and Derwin James were named to the pre-season All-ACC team.

Florida State finished the regular season with nine wins and was picked to play in the Orange Bowl, a fifth straight appearance in a major bowl game, where they defeated Michigan to finish with double digit wins for the fifth straight season and secure a top ten finish in the polls. During the season, the Seminoles notched their seventh consecutive win over Miami and their fourth consecutive win over Florida, making this senior class the first to go unbeaten against their rivals. Defensive end DeMarcus Walker and running back Dalvin Cook were named consensus All-Americans.

The season was documented on Showtime's A Season with Florida State Football.

Before the season

Returning

Offense
 Sean Maguire
 Dalvin Cook
 Freddie Stevenson
 Jesus Wilson
 Travis Rudolph
 Kermit Whitfield
 Ermon Lane
 Ryan Izzo
 Roderick Johnson
 Kareem Are
 Alec Eberle
 Wilson Bell
 Brock Ruble
 Chad Mavety
 Ryan Hoefeld

Defense
 DeMarcus Walker
 Derrick Nnadi
 Josh Sweat
 Trey Marshall
 Ro'Derrick Hoskins
 Marquez White
 Derwin James
 Jacob Pugh
 Nate Andrews
 Matthew Thomas

Departures

Offense
 Everett Golson
 Mario Pender

Defense
 Nile Lawrence-Stample
 Reggie Northrup
 Terrance Smith
 Lamarcus Brutus
 Javien Elliott
 Tyler Hunter
 Tyrell Lyons
 Giorgio Newberry
 Jalen Ramsey
 Chris Casher
 Lorenzo Featherston (Medical DQ)

Special teams
 Roberto Aguayo
 Cason Beatty

Recruiting class

Spring game

After the season

NFL draft
The following players were selected in the 2017 NFL Draft:

Coaching staff

Media
Florida State football is broadcast on the Florida State University Seminoles Radio Network and the games are called by Gene Deckerhoff. In Tallahassee, games can be heard on WWOF.

Rankings

Schedule

Ole Miss

Charleston Southern

Louisville

South Florida

North Carolina

Miami (FL)

Wake Forest

Clemson

NC State

Boston College

Syracuse

Florida

Orange Bowl: Michigan

Awards
 Bronko Nagurski Award finalist
Tarvarus McFadden

 Doak Walker Award finalist
Dalvin Cook

Ted Hendricks Award finalist
DeMarcus Walker

 Maxwell Award semifinalist
Dalvin Cook

 Walter Camp Award semifinalist
Dalvin Cook

Watchlists
Dodd Trophy
Jimbo Fisher

Rimington Trophy
Alec Eberle

Lott Trophy
Derwin James

Maxwell Award
Dalvin Cook

Bednarik Award
Derwin James
DeMarcus Walker

John Mackey Award
Ryan Izzo

Outland Trophy
Roderick Johnson

Nagurski Award
Derwin James
DeMarcus Walker

Jim Thorpe Award
Derwin James

Biletnikoff Award
Kermit Whitfield 
Travis Rudolph

Wuerffel Trophy
Alec Eberle

Doak Walker Award
Dalvin Cook

Walter Camp Award
Dalvin Cook
Derwin James

Lombardi Award
DeMarcus Walker
Roderick Johnson
Dalvin Cook

 Manning Award
Deondre Francois

Honors

All-ACC

All-Americans

References

Florida State
Florida State Seminoles football seasons
Orange Bowl champion seasons
Florida State Seminoles football